is a railway station in the town of Shibata, Miyagi Prefecture, Japan, operated by East Japan Railway Company (JR East).

Lines

Station layout
The station has two opposed side platforms connected to the station building by a footbridge. The station has a Midori no Madoguchi staffed ticket office.

Platforms

History
Funaoka Station opened on February 25, 1929. The station was absorbed into the JR East network upon the privatization of the Japanese National Railways (JNR) on April 1, 1987.

Passenger statistics
In fiscal 2018, the station was used by an average of 3,326 passengers daily (boarding passengers only).

Surrounding area
 Shibata City Hall
 Shibata Post Office
 site of Shibata Castle
Sendai University

See also
 List of Railway Stations in Japan

References

External links

  

Railway stations in Miyagi Prefecture
Tōhoku Main Line
Railway stations in Japan opened in 1929
Shibata, Miyagi